Midnight at the Pera Palace (Turkish: Pera Palas'ta Gece Yarısı), is a 2022 Turkish time travel historical drama television series directed by Emre Şahin starring Hazal Kaya, Tansu Biçer and Selahattin Paşalı. The show was released on Netflix on March 3, 2022, with the first season consisting of 8 episodes. Centered around the real-life Pera Palace Hotel, the series was inspired by the 2014 historical non-fiction book Midnight at the Pera Palace: The Birth of Modern Istanbul by Charles King.

Premise
Esra (Hazal Kaya), a young orphaned journalist in modern-day Istanbul, is assigned to write an article about the upcoming 130th anniversary of the Pera Palace Hotel. At the hotel, she meets its manager, Ahmet (Tansu Biçer), who shows her around and explains the history of the Pera Palace and some of its famous guests. Esra is particularly intrigued by the story of Peride, a young woman who apparently saved Mustafa Kemal from an assassination plot orchestrated by the British in 1919, during the occupation of Istanbul. 

What Ahmet conceals from her is that, in combination with a mysterious key, one of the hotel's rooms becomes a time-travelling portal. That night, Esra accidentally time travels back to 1919, where she is soon mistaken for her apparent doppelganger, Peride. Her encounters with men such as George, a scheming British officer (James Chalmers), Halit, an enigmatic nightclub owner (Selahattin Paşalı), and Reşat, a police officer in love with Peride (Engin Hepileri) leave her struggling to know whom to trust. Together with Ahmet, however, she must find a way to stop the assassination attempt on Mustafa Kemal and preserve the course of Turkey's independence.

Cast and characters
 Hazal Kaya as Esra/Peride
 Tansu Biçer as Ahmet
 Selahattin Paşalı as Halit
 Engin Hepileri as Reşat
 Hakan Dinçkol as Mustafa Kemal Atatürk
 Yasemin Szawlowski as Sonia
 James Chalmers as George
 Ahmet Varlı as Dimitri
 Nergis Öztürk as Eleni
 Osman Albayrak as Naim Efendi
 Ergün Metin as Fahrettin
 Clare Louise Frost as Agatha Christie

References

2022 Turkish television series debuts
Turkish-language Netflix original programming
Turkish drama television series
Turkish historical television series
Turkish time travel television series
Television series based on novels